British Columbia Highway 3, officially named the Crowsnest Highway, is an  highway that traverses southern British Columbia, Canada.  It runs from the Trans-Canada Highway (Highway 1) at Hope to Crowsnest Pass at the Alberta border and forms the western portion of the interprovincial Crowsnest Highway that runs from Hope to Medicine Hat, Alberta. The highway is considered a Core Route of the National Highway System.

Route description

Highway 3 begins in Hope. From Vancouver, the Trans-Canada Highway (Highway 1) enters Hope from the west as a four-lane freeway; however at Exit 170, Highway 1 exits the freeway and continues north along the Fraser River. There, the freeway turns north and continues as the Coquihalla Highway (Highway 5) towards Merritt while Highway 3 takes the exit and continues east through Manning Provincial Park for  towards the town of Princeton. After the summit of Allison Pass, where Highway 3 crosses from the Fraser Valley Regional District into the Regional District of Okanagan-Similkameen, the road descends for  along the Similkameen River before beginning another long climb up Sunday Summit. Soon after Sunday Summit is the descent into Princeton, where it meets Highway 5A.

Prior to the opening of Highway 97C in 1990, this was the primary link between the Lower Mainland and the Okanagan Valley, and still functions as the main alternative route.  southeast of Keremeos, through Richter Pass, and Highway 3 reaches the Town of Osoyoos and a junction with Highway 97. On the east end of Osoyoos, Highway 3 crosses Osoyoos Lake before entering the Monashee Mountains, ascending Anarchist Mountain through a stretch of switchbacks. Beyond the summit of Anarchist Mountain, in the upland rural community which shares the same name, Highway 3 enters the Regional District of Kootenay Boundary and proceeds to hug the Canada–United States border.

East from Christina Lake, Highway 3 travels for  through Bonanza Pass to its junction with Highway 3B at Nancy Greene Provincial Park, which is the cutoff to Rossland and Trail, passing Red Mountain Resort en route.

East of Burnt Flat, Highway 3 heads into the Selkirk Mountains and passes through the Kootenay Pass, at  it is the highest point on the Crowsnest Highway, on a stretch known as the Kootenay Skyway, or Salmo-Creston Skyway.  east of Burnt Flat, Highway 3 reaches the town of Creston in the Kootenay River valley, just past junctions with Highway 21 and Highway 3A. East of Creston, Highway 3 passes through the Purcell Mountains and  later, intersects Highway 95 near Yahk. Highway 93 and Highway 3 share a common alignment for the next , passing through the Rocky Mountain Trench, crosses the Kootenay River, and enters the Rocky Mountains, where at Elko Highway 93 diverges south.

History

Highway 3 is predated by the Dewdney Trail, a  trail used in the mid-19th century that connected the Lower Mainland to present-day Fort Steele, roughly paralleling the Canada-United States border; about 80% of the present-day highway follows the historic trail. In the early 20th century, the province began to upgrade its trails to roads, and in 1928, it was the first automobile route that connected to the Alberta border. Designated as the Southern Trans-Provincial Highway, it ran from Vancouver to Crowsnest Pass and later designated as Route 'A'; the route followed Kingsway and Yale Road from Vancouver to Hope, then turning north to Spences Bridge. The route then turned southeast and passed through Merritt and Princeton along present-day Highway 8 and Highway 5A before travelling east through Osoyoos, Grand Forks and Trail.  The route included major ferry crossings at Castlegar, Nelson, and Balfour, before continuing through Creston and Cranbrook to the Alberta border.

In 1932, a more northern route following the mainline of the Canadian Pacific Railway known as the Central Trans-Provincial Highway and designated as Route 'B''' was chosen as the future alignment of the Trans-Canada Highway. In 1941, British Columbia transitioned from lettered to numbered highways, with the Lower Mainland section of Route 'A' and all of Route 'B' becoming Highway 1, while the remainder of Route 'A' became Highway 3. In 1954, a new highway was constructed from Trail to Salmo and was designated as Highway 3A. Highway 3A and Highway 6 shared a common alignment from Salmo to Nelson, meeting with Highway 3. On November 7, 1957, the $4 million West Arm Bridge (also known as the Nelson Bridge) was opened across the West Arm of Kootenay Lake in Nelson, replacing ferry service.

The 1960s saw the construction of several major realignments and upgrades along the highway. In 1965, the Rossland-Sheep Lake Highway was completed, linking to the new Christina Lake-Castlegar section through Bonanza Pass (opened in 1962 with the completion of the Paulson Bridge), replacing a gravel mountain road that had connected Cascade City and Rossland. As part of the Kootenay Skyway project, the bypassed section of Highway 3 became Highway 3A, while the bypassed section of Highway 3 between Trail and Castlegar became part of Highway 22. Highway 3A between Trail and Salmo, as well as the new Rossland-Sheep Lake Highway, became Highway 3B. On July 7, 1965, the Richter Pass section between Keremeos and Osoyoos opened (the bypassed section became Highway 3A), along with the Kinnaird Bridge in Castlegar, bypassing the final ferry crossing. In the morning hours of January 9, 1965, one of the largest landslides occurred in Canadian history occurred near Hope, killing four people; known as the Hope Slide. As a result, the highway had to be rerouted around and over the base of the slide's debris field. According to the B.C. MOTI, the replacement road was built a relatively short period of thirteen days. The highway built immediately after the slide has now been bypassed by a new four lane alignment to the south, which opened in 1982. Note the way the roads meet each other, showing that the new alignment had yet to be opened.

With the opening of the Trans-Canada Highway through Rogers Pass in 1962, Highway 1 became the preferred route between the Lower Mainland and Alberta.  Efforts were made to promote the southern route as a more scenic alternative to the Trans-Canada Highway, beginning in the 1970s with a group from southern Alberta spearheading a proposal to rename Highway 3 in both provinces. Their efforts were successful when the route was renamed the Crowsnest Highway in 1977, with new route shields appearing a few years later. As part of the first phase of the Coquihalla Highway which opened in 1986, a  section of the Crowsnest Highway was upgraded to a freeway, including a bypass of the old segment through Hope, which was renamed to Hope-Princeton Way''.

As a result of the November 2021 Pacific Northwest floods, the Crowsnest Highway was damaged by landslides, while the Trans-Canada Highway and Coquihalla Highway had bridges that were completely washed out. Officials projected that Highway 3 would be the first of several damaged routes to reopen, and thus be the first to reconnect Canada's road network to Metro Vancouver. After this occurred, Highway 3 suffered from a high rate of crashes as it experienced volumes of truck traffic traveling at speeds faster than posted speed limits.

Major intersections

See also 

Dewdney Trail
Kettle Valley Railway (southern mainline of the CPR)

References

External links 

Crowsnest Highway

003
Interior of British Columbia
Castlegar, British Columbia
Cranbrook, British Columbia
Highways in the Okanagan